The Ashgabat indoor tennis arena (Aşgabat tennis toplumy) is a tennis complex in Ashgabat, Turkmenistan. The complex is the host of the annual 2017 Asian Indoor and Martial Arts Games.  The stadium court has a capacity of 4,000 people.

General information 
Indoor tennis arena includes 2 blocks. One of these blocks has a 42m x 24,5m hall and is designed for competitions and has permanent stands for 4,000 people. The other block has 4 training courts.

Near the indoor court, has 7 open tennis courts and 1 open court with tribune for 2,000 spectators.

See also
 List of tennis stadiums by capacity

References

External links
Asgfabat Indoor tennis arena

Indoor arenas
Tennis venues
Sports venues in Ashgabat
Sports venues completed in 2016
2016 establishments in Turkmenistan